John McMullan (June 28, 1933 – April 1, 1994) was an American football guard who played two seasons with the New York Titans of the American Football League He was drafted with the 165th pick in the 14th round of the 1956 NFL draft He played college football at Notre Dame

References

1933 births
1994 deaths
American football guards
New York Titans (AFL) players
Notre Dame Fighting Irish football players
Players of American football from New York City